V. M. Sudheeran (born 26 May 1948) is an Indian politician, who was a former President of the Kerala Pradesh Congress Committee (KPCC), former Speaker of the Kerala Legislative Assembly, Health Minister of Kerala, and a prominent political leader in Kerala. He was a member of the 6th, 11th, 12th and 13th Lok Sabha representing Alappuzha each time and a member of the Kerala Legislative Assembly from 1980 to 1996 representing Manalur.

Political career

Sudheeran started his political career through the Kerala Students Union (KSU), which he served as President from 1971 to 1973. He was elected President of the State Youth Congress in 1975 and continued in the position till 1977. He was elected to the 6th Lok Sabha in 1977 from Alapuzha. In 1980, he contested the Niyamasabha elections from Manalur and won. He remained the MLA from the constituency until 1996.

He served as the Speaker of Kerala Legislative Assembly from 1985 to 1987. In 1995, he was appointed Health Minister under Chief Minister A. K. Antony. In 1996, he sought election to the 11th Lok Sabha from Alappuzha and won again. He was re-elected from the same constituency again in 1998 and 1999. In 1999 he defeated the renowned Malayalam film Actor Murali with a considerable majority.

In 2004 he lost to K. S. Manoj of the CPI(M). In 2009, he refused to contest the elections despite persuasions from party leadership and various social circles, stating that younger politicians need to be given opportunities. He is a true Gandhian.

On 10 February 2014, he was selected KPCC President by the High Command of the Indian National Congress. He resigned from the post on 10 March 2017, owing to health reasons although it is widely speculated that his resignation is part of a massive organizational revamp of the KPCC.

Positions held

1971-73                       President, Kerala Students’ Union
1975-77                       President, Kerala Pradesh Youth Congress
1977-78                       General Secretary, Indian Youth Congress
1977                          Elected to 6th Lok Sabha
1980-82                       Member, Kerala Legislative Assembly INC(U) E. K. Nayanar ministry
1982-86	               Re-Elected  Kerala Legislative Assembly INC(A)
1985-March 1987               Speaker, Kerala Legislative Assembly (K.Karunakaran Ministry)
1990-91                       Vice-President, P.C.C., Kerala
April 1995-  May 1996         Minister of Health, Kerala (A.K.Antony Ministry)
1996                          Re-elected to 11th Lok Sabha (2nd term)
1996-97                       Member, Committee on Railways
1998                          Re-elected to 12th Lok Sabha (3rd term)
1998-99                       Member, Committee of Privileges, Committee on Human Resource Development and Convenor of its Sub-Committee-II on Medical Education, Consultative Committee, Ministry of Railways
1999                          Re-elected to 13th Lok Sabha (4th term)
1999-2000                     Member, Committee on Human Resource Development
2000-2001                     Member, Committee on Ethics
2014-2017                     KPCC President.

Personal life 
He was born to  Vylopally Sankaran Mama  and Girija  at a small village named Padiyam in Anthikad on 26 May 1948. His wife is Latha Sudheeran. He has a son Sarin Sudheeran and a daughter.

References

External links 

Malayali politicians
People from Thrissur district
Living people
Speakers of the Kerala Legislative Assembly
Indian National Congress politicians from Kerala
St. Thomas College, Thrissur alumni
India MPs 1977–1979
India MPs 1996–1997
India MPs 1998–1999
India MPs 1999–2004
Lok Sabha members from Kerala
Kerala MLAs 1980–1982
Kerala MLAs 1982–1987
Kerala MLAs 1987–1991
Indian National Congress (U) politicians
Year of birth missing (living people)